Normanton was a county constituency represented in the House of Commons of the Parliament of the United Kingdom. It elected one Member of Parliament (MP) by the first past the post system of election.

Boundaries
1885–1918:

1918–1950: The Urban Districts of Altofts, Castleford, Featherstone, Methley, Normanton, and Whitwood.

1950–1983: The Urban Districts of Normanton, Rothwell, and Stanley, in the Rural District of Tadcaster the parishes of Great and Little Preston, and Swillington, and in the Rural District of Wakefield the parishes of Crofton, Sharlston, and Warmfield-cum-Heath.

1983–1997: The City of Wakefield wards of Normanton and Sharlston, Ossett, Stanley and Altofts, and Stanley and Wrenthorpe, and the City of Leeds ward of Rothwell.

1997–2010: The City of Wakefield wards of Horbury, Normanton and Sharlston, Ossett, Stanley and Altofts, and Stanley and Wrenthorpe.

The West Yorkshire constituency includes the towns of Normanton and Ossett and several villages. The area has a tradition of being working-class, but it has now become almost entirely gentrified as nearby Leeds has expanded as a financial centre.

Ossett is now actually the largest town in the area, due to its high growth in recent years.

The constituency is nicknamed the banana constituency on account of its unusual shape.

The village of Altofts, located just to the north of Normanton, was included in the constituency, despite being part of a Castleford ward, and due to move into a proposed "Pontefract and Castleford" seat.

Boundary review
Following their review of parliamentary representation in West Yorkshire, the Boundary Commission for England had created a Normanton and Pontefract constituency. In late May 2006, the Commission published a revised recommendation changing the name of this constituency to Normanton, Pontefract and Castleford.

Local newspapers and the Labour Party opposed the initial change, but following a public consultation the Commission decided to create the seat conceding only a name change – from Pontefract and Castleford, to Normanton and Pontefract. This was extended to cover all three names. The wards of Wrenthorpe and Outwood West and Stanley and Outwood East – the most affluent parts of the constituency – were joined to the Conservative-leaning commuter town of Morley, which is in the Leeds district, as Morley and Outwood. Ossett and Horbury were moved to the Wakefield constituency. At the time local groups and newspapers protested that this represented a takeover of the Wakefield district by the Leeds district. An early concern of the Labour Party was that Morley and Outwood would be won by the Conservatives in 2010. Ed Balls held the seat for Labour by just 1,101 votes, and ultimately lost the seat at the 2015 general election to the Conservatives' Andrea Jenkyns.

Members of Parliament
The constituency elected only Labour MPs since 1905, the longest run (with Gower and Makerfield) of any UK constituency.  From 1885 to 1906, it had returned Liberal-Labour MPs.

Ed Balls, the former Secretary of State for Children, Schools and Families, represented the seat from the 2005 general election until 2010 when it was abolished.

Election results

Elections in the 1880s

Elections in the 1890s

Elections in the 1900s

Elections in the 1910s 

General Election 1914–15:

Another General Election was required to take place before the end of 1915. The political parties had been making preparations for an election to take place and by the July 1914, the following candidates had been selected; 
Lib-Lab: Frederick Hall
Unionist:

Elections in the 1920s

Elections in the 1930s 

General Election 1939–40

Another General Election was required to take place before the end of 1940. The political parties had been making preparations for an election to take place and by the Autumn of 1939, the following candidates had been selected; 
Labour: Tom Smith
Conservative: T.T. Heywood

Elections in the 1940s

Elections in the 1950s

Elections in the 1960s

Elections in the 1970s

Elections in the 1980s

Elections in the 1990s

Elections in the 2000s

See also
Altofts
Horbury
Normanton
Ossett
Outwood
Sharlston
South Ossett
Stanley
Wrenthorpe

Notes and references

Sources
The Independent Labour Party and the Yorkshire Miners: The Barnsley By-Election of 1897: details on the Liberal-Labour movement in the area in the late 19th century

Constituencies of the Parliament of the United Kingdom established in 1885
Constituencies of the Parliament of the United Kingdom disestablished in 2010
Politics of Wakefield
Parliamentary constituencies in Yorkshire and the Humber (historic)
Normanton, West Yorkshire
Ed Balls